Vestibular sac may refer to:

 Saccule, a bed of sensory cells situated in the inner ear
 Utricle (ear), the other of the two otolith organs located in the vertebrate inner ear